Apantesis brillians is a moth of the family Erebidae. It was described by Schmidt in 2009. It is found in Bryce Canyon National Park in Utah.

The length of the forewings is about 16.1 mm. The ground colour of the forewings is dark brownish black with ivory bands. The hindwings are bright orange-pink with a black pattern. Adults have been recorded on wing in July.

This species was formerly a member of the genus Grammia, but was moved to Apantesis along with the other species of the genera Grammia, Holarctia, and Notarctia.

Etymology
The species name reflects the bright, saturated colours of the hindwing.

References

 Natural History Museum Lepidoptera generic names catalog

Arctiina
Moths described in 2009